Dieter Rex (2 January 1936, in Bad Frankenhausen – 20 November 2002) was a German painter and designer.

Awards 
 1970: Handel Prize
 1981: Art Prize of the German Democratic Republic.

References 

20th-century German painters
20th-century German male artists
1936 births
2002 deaths
People from Bad Frankenhausen
Handel Prize winners